Rakers is a surname. Notable people with the surname include:

Aaron Rakers (born 1977), American baseball pitcher
Jason Rakers (born 1973), American baseball player
Judith Rakers (born 1976), German television presenter

See also
Raker (disambiguation)
Rekers
The Rakers